Grit Slaby (born 18 May 1965) is a German swimmer. She competed in the women's 400 metre individual medley at the 1980 Summer Olympics for East Germany.

References

External links
 

1965 births
Living people
German female swimmers
Olympic swimmers of East Germany
Swimmers at the 1980 Summer Olympics
People from Borna
Sportspeople from Saxony